Ranahar is a 2018 Nepali  historical fiction novel by Yogesh Raj. It was published on 2 June 2018 by Nepa~laya publications The book won the Madan Puraskar of that year. The book follows the life of Ranajit Malla, the last king of Bhaktapur and his defeat to Prithvi Narayan Shah. The name of the main character is Ranajit (one who triumphs in the war) whereas Ranahar means defeat in the war, so the title of the book is a wordplay on the name of the protagonist.

Synopsis 
The book journeys the life of the prince from his childhood to his defeat. The book shows the culture and society of that period. The construction of Nyatapola Temple by his father King Bhupatindra Malla is also a part of the story of the novel. The book also contains lots of words in Nepal Bhasa.

Reception 
The book won the prestigious Madan Puraskar for 2018 (2075 BS).

See also 

 Maharani
 Yogmaya
 Seto Dharti

References 

Madan Puraskar-winning works
Nepalese novels
Malla dynasty
2018 Nepalese novels
Novels set in Nepal
Nepali-language novels
Nepalese historical novels